Consent is a 2017 play by Nina Raine. Its premiere production was at the National Theatre from 4 April to 17 May 2017. This run received positive reviews. In his 5 star review for The Independent, Paul Taylor stated "One of Nina Raine's most enjoyable and intelligent plays yet. Unreservedly recommended." In his 4 star review for The Telegraph, Dominic Cavendish described the play as a "tense, entertaining modern-day tragi-comedy... Is it worth seeing this ambitious would-be play for today? My much mulled verdict: yes, absolutely."

The 2017 production was revived for a West End transfer in May 2018 with the same director (Roger Michell) but a largely new cast and ran at the Harold Pinter Theatre until 11 August.

Premiere casts

References

2017 plays
British plays